Isaac Richards (11 February 1859 – 10 May 1936) was an Anglican bishop in New Zealand from 1920 to 1934.

Life and church career
Richards was born in Tavistock, Devon, and educated at Wesleyan College, Taunton, and Exeter College, Oxford, where he matriculated in 1878, graduating B.A. in 1882, and M.A. in 1885. He was ordained in 1882. He became curate of St Paul's, Truro, in 1883, and married Gertrude Oxland in 1885. They migrated to New Zealand in 1886 when he became vicar of St Mark's, Remuera, in Auckland.

In 1895 he became Warden of Selwyn College in Dunedin, and in 1900, vicar of Tuapeka in Central Otago. He was canon of St Paul's Cathedral, Dunedin, and archdeacon successively of Queenstown and of Invercargill. He became Bishop of Dunedin in 1920, holding the position until he retired owing to ill-health in 1934.

He and his wife had a daughter and four sons, two of whom were killed at Gallipoli in 1915.

Cricketing career
While he was a vicar in Auckland, Richards played five first-class cricket matches for Auckland between 1890 and 1894 as a batsman and occasional wicketkeeper. He continued playing club cricket after he moved to Dunedin in 1895.

Publications
Richards wrote several pamphlets on church matters and two books:
The Church in Danger, or, The General Synod and the Constitution (1912)
The Lord and Giver of Life: Addresses on the presence of the Holy Spirit in the world and in the church (1916)

See also

 List of Auckland representative cricketers

References

1859 births
1936 deaths
People from Tavistock
People educated at Queen's College, Taunton
Alumni of Exeter College, Oxford
Anglican archdeacons in New Zealand
Anglican bishops of Dunedin
20th-century Anglican bishops in New Zealand
New Zealand cricketers
Auckland cricketers
Wicket-keepers